Florida's 22nd congressional district is a U.S. congressional district in Southeast Florida. In the 2020 redistricting cycle, it was drawn as a successor to the previous 21st district and includes Palm Beach, West Palm Beach, Boynton Beach and Delray Beach, as well as unincorporated Palm Beach County. The previous iteration of the 22nd district, which extended from Fort Lauderdale to Boca Raton, was instead renamed the 23rd district.

In 2017 to 2023, the district encompassed the coastline of Broward County to southern Palm Beach County and included Boca Raton, Fort Lauderdale, Coral Springs and part of Pompano Beach. It also included Florida Atlantic University and Port Everglades, the third busiest cruise port in the world.

The new district is represented by Democrat Lois Frankel, incumbent from the 21st district who was re-elected in 2022. Fellow Democrat Ted Deutch represented the old 22nd congressional district from 2017 after he was redistricted from Florida's 21st congressional district until his resignation on September 30, 2022.

The new 22nd district has one of the highest populations of Jewish Americans in the country. In 2020, the election between two Jewish candidates, Democratic incumbent Rep. Lois Frankel and right-wing activist Laura Loomer, drew national attention. Loomer used Holocaust imagery and Yiddish to attack Frankel as an opponent of Jewish interests.

History
The district was created in 1993 in response to the 1990 United States Census, mostly out of the former 15th District.   E. Clay Shaw, Jr., who had represented the 15th and its predecessors since 1981, represented this district until 2007, when he lost re-election to Democrat Ron Klein. However, Klein himself was ousted by Republican Allen West during the 2010 midterms. After redistricting made the 22nd friendlier to Democrats, West left the district for an unsuccessful bid for re-election in the 18th district.

The 22nd Congressional District was the center of the disputed 2000 presidential election in Florida and the ensuing recount.

Demographics
Male: 48.8%
Female: 51.2%
Median age: 43.0
18 years and over: 81.1%
65 years and over: 20.8%
Employed: 58.1%
Median household income: $51,200
Families below poverty level: 4.6%
Bachelor's degree or higher: 34.1%

Election results from presidential races

List of members representing the district

Election results

1992

1994
Incumbent E. Clay Shaw Jr. received a primary challenger – Pompano Beach business execute John Stahl. During the primary, Stahl described himself as a "productive-class taxpayer" and labeled Shaw a "career politician". Shaw responded by saying, "I understand business, running a business and my voting record is proof of that." Stahl also accused Shaw of abusing his congressional franking privilege; a report from the National Taxpayers Union indicated that Shaw spent $240,000 for mailings in 1993. Additionally, Stahl vowed to cut his salary to $100,000 if elected. By July 15, 1994, Shaw's campaign contributions totaled $283,390, while Stahl raised only $900. Nevertheless, Shaw defeated Stahl in the primary elected by a vote of 24,252 to 6,925 (77.8%-22.2%).

In the general election, Shaw faced-off against Palm Beach Town Council President Hermine Wiener, a Democrat who left the Republican Party about a year earlier. Wiener did not receive a challenger for the Democratic nomination. Throughout the year, she raised $216,596 and vowed to spend as much as $1 million, if necessary. Shaw signed the Contract with America and specifically promised to reform welfare during the next congress. On October 25, the League of Women Voters hosted a debate between the two candidates at the Broward County Main Library in Fort Lauderdale. Shaw was endorsed by The News, a Boca Raton-based newspaper, and the Sun-Sentinel. The former cited Wiener's lack of specifics on key issues such as health care and immigration as their rationale for favoring Shaw. However, The News also stated that Shaw "hasn't paid enough attention to his new constituents." The Sun-Sentinel praised Shaw for his positions on various issues, and remarked that "[he is an] intelligent, hard-working congressman who has shown effectiveness and leadership ability while maintaining a high level of integrity during his entire political career."

Overall, Wiener received little support from prominent local elected officials, as Shaw was favored to win re-election. Shaw did, in fact, handily defeat Wiener in the general election by a margin of 63.36%-36.64%.

1996

1998
On January 19, 1998, incumbent E. Clay Shaw Jr. announced that he would seek re-election for a ninth term. Shaw faced no opposition in either the primary on September 1 or the general election on November 3.

2000

2002

2004

2006

2008

2010

2012

2014

2016

2018

2020

2022

References

 Congressional Biographical Directory of the United States 1774–present

21